Djama Ali Moussa Zayli'i was a Somali politician. He was a politician of the former French Somaliland, currently known as Djibouti. 

Born in Awdal, he became one of the first Senator from Djibouti or French Somaliland. His family was from the Mahadcase, Bahabar Celi section of the Gadabuursi clan, part of the wider Dir clan.

History 
Djama Ali Moussa born in 1910 in Awdal then French Somaliland, before he entered politics he used to be a sailor. He was elected as the first representative of French Somaliland in the French National Assembly in 1946, and in December that year he was also elected as the first Somali head  of French Somaliland.

Political Affiliation 
 Groupe de l'Union Républicaine 
 Résistante pour l'Union Française

References 

 page on the French Senate website

Ethnic Somali people
French Somaliland
Gadabuursi
Somalian politicians
1910s births
1959 deaths
Senators of French East Africa
Djiboutian politicians